The 2003 West Somerset District Council election took place on 1 May 2003 to elect members of West Somerset District Council in Somerset, England. The whole council was up for election and the Conservative party stayed in overall control of the council.

Election result

5 Conservatives, 2 independents and 1 Liberal Democrat were unopposed at the election. One of the independent councillors, Michael Gammon, took the Conservative whip.

Ward results

By-elections between 2003 and 2007

References

2003 English local elections
2003
2000s in Somerset